Malleval-en-Vercors is a commune in the Isère department in southeastern France.

The commune was named Malleval until September 12, 2005.

Population

See also 
 Communes of the Isère department
Parc naturel régional du Vercors

References

Mallevalenvercors
Isère communes articles needing translation from French Wikipedia